Jasper Township is an inactive township in Ralls County, in the U.S. state of Missouri.

Jasper Township has the name of Jasper Smith, an early settler.

References

Townships in Missouri
Townships in Ralls County, Missouri